This is a list of rock formations in New Zealand based on their aesthetic and cultural importance. New Zealand's geomorphology is formed through an interaction between uplift, erosion and the underlying rock type. Most of the notable examples listed here are formed by selective erosion, for example waves and rivers can more easily erode sandstone than basalt and can also exploit joints or faults in the rock-mass. Some rocks like limestone (Waitomo Caves) and marble (Takaka Hill) can also be dissolved in water which forms a distinctive karst geomorphology. Notable rock formations are also formed through constructive processes such as geothermal and volcanic deposits, and sedimentary deposition.

North Island formations

South Island formations

Formations elsewhere

Maps

See also 

 List of caves of New Zealand
 List of rock formations
 Stratigraphy of New Zealand
 Geomorphology

References 

 
New Zealand geology-related lists
Lists of landforms of New Zealand